Raorchestes menglaensis (Zhishihe's bubble-nest frog or Mengla small treefrog) is a species of frog in the family Rhacophoridae. Only known from its type locality, Zhishihe in Mengla County, it is endemic to Yunnan, China, although it is expected to occur more widely, including adjacent Laos.

Raorchestes menglaensis are small frogs: males measure only  in snout-vent length, whereas females are slightly larger at  SVL. It is a very rare species known from fewer than 10 specimens. It inhabits streamside shrubland. It is threatened by habitat loss.

References

External links
 

menglaensis
Amphibians of China
Endemic fauna of Yunnan
Taxonomy articles created by Polbot
Amphibians described in 1990